Charles Riotteau (20 May 1875 – 9 April 1954) was a French sports shooter. He competed in the 25 m rapid fire pistol event at the 1924 Summer Olympics.

References

External links
 

1875 births
1954 deaths
French male sport shooters
Olympic shooters of France
Shooters at the 1924 Summer Olympics
Place of birth missing
20th-century French people